The Counts of Hohenberg (or Margraves of Hohenberg) were an ancient Swabian dynasty in the southwest of the present-day Germany the state of Baden-Württemberg. 

In the 13th century, the dynasty of Hohenberg was one of the most prominent lineages in southwestern Germany. In 1381, however, Rudolf III, Count of Hohenberg, who was highly indebted and had no male successor, sold the core of the county to the House of Habsburg. About 100 years later, the last sideline died out. The County of Hohenberg persisted de jure until 1806.

External links 
The Counts of Hohenberg (German)
Article in the ADB (German) 

Hohenberg, Swabia
Hohenberg
Former states and territories of Baden-Württemberg
Hohenberg